Kurkinorin is a non-nitrogenous, extremely selective centrally acting μ-opioid receptor agonist derived from salvinorin A with no sedating or rewarding effects.

See also 
 Herkinorin
 Samidorphan
 Norbinaltorphimine

References 

Heterocyclic compounds with 3 rings
Isochromenes
3-Furyl compounds
Methyl esters
Benzoate esters